Konstantin Borisovich Pulikovsky (Russian: Константин Борисович Пуликовский; born 9 February 1948), is a Russian military commander and statesman, a lieutenant general of the reserve. He was the Plenipotentiary Representative of the President of the Russian Federation in the Far Eastern Federal District from 18 May 2000 to 14 November 2005. 
He last served as the Head of Rostekhnadzor from 5 December 2005 to 2 September 2008.

Biography
Konstantin Pulikovsky was born on 9 February 1948.

Education

He also graduated from the Military Academy of Armored Forces in 1982. In 1992, the Military Academy of the General Staff of the Armed Forces of Russia.

Labor activity
For 33 years, Pulikovsky served in the Soviet Army. He was a member of the Communist Party of the Soviet Union, and held command positions in units, formations, operational and operational-strategic formations of the army. He saw military service in Belarus, Turkmenistan, Estonia, Lithuania, and the Caucasus.

During the New Year's assault on Grozny, Pulikovsky commanded the Sever grouping, which included the Maikop brigade and the Samara regiment, which suffered heavy losses. From 1996 to 1997, he was the commander of the united group of federal forces in the Chechen Republic, deputy commander of the North Caucasian Military District, and the participant in the First Chechen War.

From 1998 to 2008, he was assistant to the mayor of Krasnodar , for work with municipal enterprises, head of the city improvement committee. He was the chairman of the regional branch of the public organization of veterans "Combat Brotherhood".

From 18 May 2000 to 14 November 2005, Pulikovsky served as the 1st Plenipotentiary Representative of the President of the Russian Federation in the Far Eastern Federal District,  and the member of the Security Council of Russia, during which he accompanied North Korean leader Kim Jong-il in his train visit to Russia in 2001.

From 5 December 2005 to 2 September 2008, Pulikovsky was the head of the Federal Service for Environmental, Technological and Nuclear Supervision (Rostekhnadzor).

In the last years, the chairman of the council of the regional branch of the A Just Russia in the Krasnodar Krai, in 2011, according to the party's list, he ran for the State Duma deputies, without entering the federal parliament, he left the party.

Family
He is married and had two sons, and Sergey. Aleksey was the eldest son, an officer of the Russian Armed Forces, who died during the armed conflict in the Chechen Republic on 14 December 1995 in the village of Shatoy when unblocking the  's checkpoint captured by the militants. Sergey is the Deputy Head of the Krasnodar Krai focusing on domestic policy.

References

1948 births
Living people
A Just Russia politicians
People from Ussuriysk
1st class Active State Councillors of the Russian Federation
Recipients of the Order "For Merit to the Fatherland", 4th class
Recipients of the Order of Honour (Russia)
Recipients of the Order "For Personal Courage"
Recipients of the Order "For Service to the Homeland in the Armed Forces of the USSR", 3rd class
Recipients of the Order of Holy Prince Daniel of Moscow
Soviet lieutenant generals
Military Academy of the General Staff of the Armed Forces of Russia alumni
Russian lieutenant generals
Communist Party of the Soviet Union members